Almir Nelson de Almeida, also commonly known simply as Almir (2 September 1923 – 14 April 1977), was a Brazilian basketball player who competed in the 1952 Summer Olympics.
He was born in Salvador - Bahia.

References

1923 births
1977 deaths
Sportspeople from Salvador, Bahia
Brazilian men's basketball players
1954 FIBA World Championship players
Olympic basketball players of Brazil
Basketball players at the 1951 Pan American Games
Basketball players at the 1952 Summer Olympics
Basketball players at the 1955 Pan American Games
Pan American Games medalists in basketball
Pan American Games bronze medalists for Brazil
Medalists at the 1955 Pan American Games